Rose Ann Creal  (3 November 1865 – 7 August 1921) was an Australian nurse serving during World War I.

Early life
She was born on 3 November 1865 at Young, New South Wales. She was one of five children of John Creal, an Irish born miner and Ann (née Brady) also of Irish descent. In 1872 when Rose was seven years old, her mother and newborn brother died. She was educated at home by her father until the age of 16 when she began a job in a small hospital in Parkes, New South Wales.

She worked there for many years and was appointed as a member of the Australian Army Nursing Service Reserve. She enlisted for war service on 14 August 1916 and arrived in Egypt on 23 September 1916. She served as a nurse for three years during the Great War and returned to Australia during January 1920. She died almost a year and a half later on 7 August 1921 after an attack of appendicitis.

Nursing 
Rose Ann Creal began working at a small hospital in Parkes at the young age of 16. The matron of the hospital in Parkes described Rose as "a diamond of the first water". Recognizing the quality and potential of her young assistant, the matron at the Hospital in Parkes arranged for Rose to be taken on as a probationer at Sydney Hospital. Then by 1891 she was head nurse of a ward. When the hospital's matron resigned in 1898, Senior Sister Creal was made an acting matron. Her appointment was confirmed in February 1899 and later that year she became a founding member and councillor of the Trained Nurses' Association of New South Wales.

Rose Creal participated in many events in Australia at the turn of the 20th century, including military nursing. Nurses who joined the AANS (Australian Imperial Force) during peacetime and attended prescribed lectures were the first to be called upon when World War I broke out in August 1914. These civilian trained nurses, including Creal, were known as 'efficient' Creal became the principal matron of the 2nd Military District. Creal's role in this position was to complete her main duties and she, like a number of hospital matrons, was feeling the effects of nursing staff shortages due to the high levels of nursing recruits to the war effort.

World War I 
Before, World War 1 Rose was a member of the Australian Army Nursing service reserve. In October 1914 she was given the role of principal matron of the second military district located in New South Wales while she was still the matron at the Sydney Hospital. On 14 August 1916 Matron Creal enlisted for war service nominating her sister Elizabeth (‘Bessie’) as her next of kin. She worked on the Hospital Ship (Karoola) on 19 August 1916 and started her duty of matron of the 14th Australian General Hospital at Abbassia Egypt on 23 September. The casualties of the Australian Light Horse were treated as a priority, and in November 1916 were up to about 570 people.

Following heavy fighting at Magdhaba and Rafa the casualties rose to over 900 and by May 1917, after the battle of Gaza, to 1140. Due to the large number of casualties it placed great pressure on the nursing staff. In her report for September 1917, Creal paid tribute to the nurses' selfless devotion to duty, after the first battle of Gaza when some of the nurses worked for eighteen hours at a time. When the hospital moved to Port Said in February 1918, Miss Rose Creal was known for the way she welcomed the injured soldiers as they arrived at the hospital and dedicated herself to their care. H.S. Gullett said "No womanhood has ever presented a richer association of feminine tenderness and shear capacity". The hospital in Parkes had several nurses who served during World War One with Sister Isobel Rose Smith, Sister Mary Ann Hutton, Matron Rose Ann Creal, Sister Florence Lynch and Sister Grace Linda Tomlinson all either leaving from the Parkes Shire or upon returning from service came to call the Parkes Shire their home.

Awards and recognition 
For her work in Egypt, Rose Ann Creal was awarded the Royal Red Cross (First class) in 1919 New Year Honours. In August and September 1919 she completed an elocution course and tour of hospitals in England and Scotland "with the view of becoming conversant in the latest methods employed in these countries".

Sydney Hospital established the Rose Creal Medal in her honour; it is the highest award for students of the Lucy Osborn School of Nursing.

Creal Place, in the Canberra suburb of Chisholm, is named in her honour.

Death 
On 7 August 1921 Rose Ann Creal died at Sydney Hospital from appendicitis. She was accorded a military funeral, one or the largest funerals the city had seen in a long time. Hundreds of people attended the funeral lining the streets outside St James' church. Rose Ann Creal's coffin was mounted on a gun carriage and draped with the Union Jack, with her nurse's cap on top. Burial was at Waverley Cemetery.

References 

1865 births
1921 deaths
Australian nurses
Australian women nurses
People from Young, New South Wales
Members of the Royal Red Cross
19th-century Australian women
20th-century Australian women
Australian military nurses